Ivan Jovanović (born 8 July 1962) is a Serbian professional football manager and former player, who is the current manager of Greek Super League club Panathinaikos.

Playing career
Jovanović played for FK Rad in the Yugoslav First League during the 1987–88 and 1988–89 seasons. The next season, he transferred to the Greek side Iraklis, where he played until the end of his career. During his spell in Iraklis, Jovanović evolved into one of the highest quality foreign players who ever played for the team.

Managerial career

Greece
Ivan Jovanović started his managerial career on 2001 at Greek side Niki Volou. He then worked for Iraklis and Panachaiki.

APOEL
During his managerial career at APOEL he won 9 trophies, 4 Championships, 1 Cup and 4 Super Cups. He also helped APOEL to qualify for the UEFA Champions League group stages for the first time in their history in 2009. Two years later, he repeated his achievement and just not only helped APOEL to qualify for the group stages of the 2011–12 UEFA Champions League, but achieved also to qualify for the quarter-finals by topping their group, beating Olympique Lyonnais in the last 16 on penalties, before being knocked-out by Real Madrid in the quarter-finals. He is considered as the most successful manager in the history of APOEL.

During his seven-year spell at APOEL he has been awarded the "Coach of the Season" award by Cyprus Football Association six times. He has also been awarded the "Serbian Coach of the Year" award by Football Association of Serbia in 2011.

On 30 April 2013, APOEL announced that Ivan Jovanović decided to leave at the end of the 2012–13 season, after five-and-a-half consecutive (and seven in total) successful years in the club.

Al Nasr
On 18 June 2013, Jovanović was announced as the new head coach of the Emirati club Al Nasr, having signed a two-year contract. On 19 May 2014, Jovanović led his team to a 2–1 victory over Saham in the 2014 GCC Champions League final and won his first trophy as Al Nasr's manager.

On 29 October 2016, Al Nasr sacked Jovanović from the technical command of the first football team, after failing to adjust the repeated technical errors.

On 19 January 2018, Al Nasr have re-appointed Jovanović to replace Cesare Prandelli.

On 2 December 2018, Jovanović was sacked for a second time after a mixed start of the 2018–19 UAE Pro-League season.

UAE
On 22 December 2019, Ivan was appointed as the new coach of United Arab Emirates national team. On 6 April 2020 the UAE FA announced the termination of his contract.

Panathinaikos 
On June 17th 2021, it was announced that Jovanović had been appointed as head coach of Panathinaikos under a one-year contract. He earned victory in his first Super League game for the Greens, beating Apollon Smyrnis 4–0. Under his management the team managed to reach its major goal, which was returning to European Competitions. At the 18th of May 2022 he signed a two years extension with the club. Three days later the team won the Greek Cup, the first title for the team in 8 years.

Managerial statistics

Honours
As Manager

Apoel
Cypriot First Division: 2003–04, 2008–09, 2010–11, 2012–13
Cypriot Cup: 2007–08
Cypriot Super Cup: 2004, 2008, 2009, 2011

Al-Nasr
GCC Champions League: 2014
UAE President's Cup: 2014–15
UAE League Cup: 2014–15

Panathinaikos
Greek Cup: 2021–22
Individual
Manager of the Season (Cyprus): 2003–04, 2008–09, 2009–10, 2010–11, 2011–12, 2012–13
Serbian Coach of the Year: 2011
Super League Greece Manager of the Year:  2021–22

References

1962 births
Living people
People from Loznica
Sportspeople from Loznica
Serbian footballers
Yugoslav footballers
Association football midfielders
FK Rad players
Iraklis Thessaloniki F.C. players
Expatriate footballers in Greece
Serbian football managers
Serbian expatriate football managers
Panachaiki F.C. managers
Iraklis Thessaloniki F.C. managers
Niki Volos F.C. managers
APOEL FC managers
Panathinaikos F.C. managers
Expatriate football managers in Cyprus
Expatriate football managers in the United Arab Emirates
Al-Nasr SC (Dubai) managers
FK Loznica players
Serbian expatriate sportspeople in the United Arab Emirates
UAE Pro League managers
United Arab Emirates national football team managers